Clypeostoma nortoni is a species of sea snail, a marine gastropod mollusk in the family Chilodontidae.

Description
It generally lives in tropical environments.  Its mineralized skeleton contains calcium carbonate.

Distribution
This marine species occurs in the Indo-West Pacific.

References

External links
 To World Register of Marine Species
 

nortoni
Gastropods described in 1984